Christopher Paul Dwyer (born April 10, 1988) is an American former professional baseball pitcher. He made his Major League Baseball (MLB) debut with the Kansas City Royals in 2013. Prior to playing professionally, Dwyer attended Clemson University, and pitched for the Clemson Tigers.

Career

Amateur
Dwyer lived in Swampscott, Massachusetts. He played American Legion baseball for the local Swampscott team. He attended St. Mary's High School in Lynn, Massachusetts, and Salisbury School in Salisbury, Connecticut. He stayed with Salisbury for a postgraduate year in 2008. The New York Yankees selected Dwyer in the 36th round of the 2008 MLB Draft, but did not sign. Instead, he attended Clemson University, where he played for the Clemson Tigers baseball team of the Atlantic Coast Conference. In 2009, he played collegiate summer baseball with the Cotuit Kettleers of the Cape Cod Baseball League. As Dwyer turned 21 in 2009, he was eligible to be selected in the 2009 MLB Draft.

Kansas City Royals
The Kansas City Royals chose Dwyer in the fourth round, and he signed with Kansas City, receiving a $1.45 million signing bonus.

In 2010, Dwyer pitched for the Wilmington Blue Rocks of the Class A-Advanced Carolina League.  Dwyer was rated the 83rd best prospect in baseball by Baseball America prior to the 2011 season, and was invited to Royals' spring training in 2012. Dwyer played for the Omaha Storm Chasers of the Class AAA Pacific Coast League (PCL) in 2013. After Omaha won the PCL championship, Dwyer pitched to victory in the Triple-A Baseball National Championship Game. He retired the first twenty batters he faced without allowing a baserunner, and won the game's most valuable player award. The Royals promoted Dwyer to the major leagues following the game. Dwyer saw two innings as a relief pitcher without earning any runs.

Dwyer was designated for assignment by the Royals on September 1, 2014.  Part of the reason for the demotion was for Dwyer to gain more experience as a relief pitcher since he had previously been a starting pitcher.

Baltimore Orioles
On February 2, 2016, Dwyer signed a minor league contract with the Baltimore Orioles.

Personal
Dwyer's sister, Lindsay, played soccer at Williams College.

References

External links

1988 births
Living people
Baseball players from Boston
Major League Baseball pitchers
Kansas City Royals players
Clemson Tigers baseball players
Cotuit Kettleers players
Idaho Falls Chukars players
Wilmington Blue Rocks players
Northwest Arkansas Naturals players
Omaha Storm Chasers players